Odyssey (also known as OTN1) is a Canadian Greek language Category A specialty channel and is owned by Odyssey Television Network. It features programming from ANT1 Satellite, a private network from Greece as well as local Canadian content produced by Odyssey and other independent companies.

Programming on Odyssey consists of news, sports, Greek serials (comedies & dramas), reality programs and more.

History
OTN1 was licensed as Odyssey on 4 September 1996 by the Canadian Radio-television and Telecommunications Commission (CRTC) as a regional ethnic specialty channel for the province of Ontario. On 6 June 1997, before the channel launched, the CRTC amended its licence to allow it to be distributed nationally. In December 1998 Odyssey Television was launched on Rogers Cable and Shaw Direct.

Notable shows
A list of notable shows that air on Odyssey, as of October 2022:
ANT1 News – nightly newscast
Kalimera Ellada – morning show, airs Monday – Friday
Ektos Yperesias – comedy, airs Monday & Tuesday
Pagidemenoi – drama, airs Monday - Wednesday
Rouk Zouk – game show, airs weekday afternoons
Who Wants to Be A Millionaire? – game show, airs Monday – Friday
Greek Super League – Live Super League matches

References

External links

ANT1 Satellite 

Analog cable television networks in Canada
Multicultural and ethnic television in Canada
Television channels and stations established in 1998
Greek-Canadian culture
Greek-language television stations
Canada–Greece relations